Gerald James McDougall (born 17 January 1967) is a former English cricketer.  McDougall was a right-handed batsman who played primarily as a wicketkeeper.  He was born at Manchester, Lancashire.

McDougall made his debut for Cambridgeshire in the 2002 MCCA Knockout Trophy, making his debut in that competition against Bedfordshire. From 2002 to 2003, he represented the county in 2 MCCA Knockout Trophy matches.  He also represented the county in 4 Minor Counties Championship matches, with his final match for Cambridgeshire in that competition coming against Staffordshire.

McDougall also played 2 List-A matches for Cambridgeshire, against the Middlesex Cricket Board in the second round of the 2003 Cheltenham & Gloucester Trophy, which was played in 2002 and against Yorkshire in the third round of the same competition.  In his 2 List-A matches, he scored 6 runs and behind the stumps he took a single catch and made 3 stumpings.

References

External links
Gerald McDougall at Cricinfo
Gerald McDougall at CricketArchive

1967 births
Living people
Cricketers from Manchester
English cricketers
Cambridgeshire cricketers
Wicket-keepers